Howard Crampton (January 12, 1865 – June 15, 1922) was an American actor of the silent era. He appeared in more than 70 films between 1913 and 1922. He was born in New York, New York.

Partial filmography

 Dr. Jekyll and Mr. Hyde (1913)
 Traffic in Souls (1913)
 The Chalice of Sorrow (1916)
 The Great Problem (1916)
 Black Orchids (1917)
 The Voice on the Wire (1917)
 The Gray Ghost (1917)
 The Scarlet Car (1917)
 Like Wildfire (1917)
 The Wife He Bought (1918)
 Humdrum Brown (1918)
 With Hoops of Steel (1918)
 The Border Raiders (1918)
 The Devil's Trail (1919)
 The Lion's Den (1919)
 The Trail of the Octopus (1919)
 Hearts Are Trumps (1920)
 The Screaming Shadow (1920)
 The Midlanders (1920)
 The Bronze Bell (1921)
 Judge Her Not (1921)
 Nan of the North (1922)

External links

1865 births
1922 deaths
American male film actors
American male silent film actors
20th-century American male actors